Sheikh Sabah II bin Jaber Al-Sabah (1784 – November 1866) was the fourth ruler of the Sheikhdom of Kuwait, ruling from 1859 to November 1866.  He was the eldest son of Jaber I Al-Sabah, whom he succeeded.

References 

19th-century people from the Ottoman Empire
19th-century Kuwaiti people
Rulers of Kuwait
House of Al-Sabah
1866 deaths
1784 births
19th-century Arabs